The General Electric CF34 is a civilian high-bypass turbofan developed by GE Aircraft Engines from its TF34 military engine. The CF34 is used on a number of business and regional jets, including the Bombardier CRJ series, the Embraer E-Jets, and Comac ARJ21. In 2012, there were 5,600 engines in service.

Design and development

The original engine contained a single stage fan driven by a 4-stage low pressure (LP) turbine, supercharging a 14-stage HP compressor driven by a 2-stage high pressure (HP) turbine, with an annular combustor. Later higher thrust versions of the CF34 feature an advanced technology core, with only 10 HP compressor stages. The LP spool has 3 core booster stages behind the fan.

On wing times can reach 14,000 hours, an overhaul costs over $1.5 million and a set of LLPs $2.1 million for a 25,000 cycle life.
In 1995, GE invested $200 million to develop the -8C derivative for the CRJ700.

GE has proposed updating the Boeing B-52 Stratofortress with CF34-10 engines.

Applications

CF34-1A
 Bombardier Challenger 601-1A
CF34-3A
 Bombardier Challenger 601-3A
CF34-3A1
 Bombardier Challenger 601-3R
 Bombardier CRJ100 ER/LR
CF34-3A2
 Bombardier Challenger 601-3A/ER
CF34-3B
 Bombardier Challenger 604
 Bombardier Challenger 605
CF34-3B1
 Bombardier Challenger 850
 Bombardier CRJ200 ER/LR
 Bombardier CRJ440 ER/LR
CF34-8C1
 Bombardier CRJ700 (Series 701) 
CF34-8C5
 Bombardier CRJ700 (Series 705)
 Bombardier CRJ900
 Bombardier CRJ900 NextGen
CF34-8C5A1
 Bombardier CRJ1000 NextGen
CF34-8C5A2
 Bombardier CRJ1000 NextGen
CF34-8C5B1
 Bombardier CRJ700 NextGen
CF34-8E
 Embraer 170
 Embraer 175
CF34-10A
 Comac ARJ21
CF34-10E
 Embraer 190
 Embraer 195
 Embraer Lineage 1000

Specifications

See also

References

External links

 General Electric CF34 page

High-bypass turbofan engines
CF34